The Smerwick Group is a Devonian lithostratigraphic group (a sequence of rock strata) in the Dingle peninsula, County Kerry, Ireland. The name is derived from the village of Smerwick (Irish: Ard na Caithne) where the strata are exposed in coastal sections on either side of Smerwick Harbour, a deep bay on the peninsula's northwest coast.

Lithology and stratigraphy 
The Group comprises the Sauce Creek, Ballydavid and Farran Sandstone formations of Devonian age including strata of fluvial and aeolian origin and conglomerates.

References 

Geologic groups of Europe
Geologic formations of Ireland
Geology of Ireland
Devonian System of Europe
Emsian Stage
Sandstone formations
Conglomerate formations
Fluvial deposits
Aeolian deposits